Jacopo Ferretti (16 July 1784 – 7 March 1852) was an Italian writer, poet and opera librettist. His name is sometimes written as Giacomo Ferretti.

He is most famous for having supplied the libretti for two operas composed by Rossini and for five operas composed by Donizetti.

Life 
Introduced by his father to literature while very young, in addition to his native Italian, Ferretti mastered not only Latin and Ancient Greek but also French and English, and began writing verse early. Even though he worked in the tobacco industry from the age of about 30 until he was over 60, he was extremely prolific, writing "everything from love letter to odes and welcoming speeches", and numerous opera libretti, all but the few listed below being generally forgotten.

His first big success was La Cenerentola, written at great speed for Rossini over Christmas in 1816. Ferretti wrote afterwards how he had agreed to write a libretto on a subject which the censor vetoed, so he met the composer and the theatre manager to discuss alternatives. He struggled to find a new subject that appealed, but about two dozen were rejected for one reason or another. At last, yawning wearily, Ferretti said "La Cenerentola" ("Cinderella") and at last Rossini decided he liked it, so Ferretti went home and began at once, worked night and day on it, and gave sections to Rossini on Christmas Day. Early on during the production there were problems, but Rossini predicted (correctly) that it would be a great success in the long term.

Ferretti married the singer Teresa Terziani in 1820, and their house was continually visited by musicians and poets, including Donizetti who had been given a letter of introduction to Ferretti by Johann Simon Mayr. They became good friends after the young composer's arrival in Rome in October 1821 for the preparation of the production of his Zoraida di Granata, which became his first major success. Ferretti worked on revising Bartolomeo Merelli's libretto for the opera.

Librettos by Ferretti 
Altogether, Ferretti wrote about 70 librettos, the majority of which were for operas presented in Rome.

References 
Notes

Other sources
Allitt, John Stewart (1991), Donizetti: in the light of Romanticism and the teaching of Johann Simon Mayr, Shaftesbury: Element Books, Ltd (UK); Rockport, MA: Element, Inc.(USA)
Bini, Analisa (1996), Jacopo Ferretti e la cultura del suo tempo ("Jacopo Ferretti and the culture of his time"), Skira. 
Black, John (1998), "Ferretti, Jacopo", in Stanley Sadie, (Ed.), The New Grove Dictionary of Opera, Vol. Two, pp. 167–168. London: Macmillan Publishers, Inc.   
Holden, Amanda (Ed.), The New Penguin Opera Guide, New York: Penguin Putnam, 2001. 

1784 births
1852 deaths
Italian poets
Italian opera librettists
Italian male poets
19th-century Italian writers
19th-century Italian poets
Italian male dramatists and playwrights
19th-century Italian male writers